Ignoramus may refer to:

Latin for "we do not know"
Ignoramus, a college farce written in 1615 in Latin by George Ruggle
An ignorant person or dunce (as a consequence of Ruggle's play)
A verdict by a Grand Jury, meaning "we do not know of any reason why this person should be indicted on these charges"

See also
Ignoramus et ignorabimus